Hugh Pryse (1910–1955) was a British character actor. He was born on 11 November 1910 with the name John Hwfa Pryse, and was billed as Hwfa Pryse in the films Penn of Pennsylvania and "Pimpernel" Smith.

His stage work included Peter Brook's production of Dark of the Moon in 1948–9 at the Ambassadors Theatre in London and John Gielgud's 1954 staging of The Cherry Orchard at the Lyric, Hammersmith.

Selected filmography
 School for Secrets (1946)
 Jassy (1947)
 The Woman in the Hall (1947)
 Easy Money (1948)
 The Story of Shirley Yorke (1948)
 Calling Paul Temple (1948)
 Christopher Columbus (1949)
 Dark Secret (1949)
 The Broken Horseshoe (1953)
 Botany Bay (1953)
 Marilyn (1953)
 The Happiness of Three Women (1954)
 Three Cases of Murder (1955)
 Port of Escape'' (1956)

References

External links
 

1910 births
1955 deaths
British male stage actors
British male film actors
British male television actors
Male actors from London
People from Hammersmith
20th-century British male actors